Clark University is a private research university in Worcester, Massachusetts. Founded in 1887 with a large endowment from its namesake Jonas Gilman Clark, a prominent businessman, Clark was one of the first modern research universities in the United States. Originally an all-graduate institution, Clark's first undergraduates entered in 1902 and women were first enrolled in 1942.

The university now offers 46 majors, minors, and concentrations in the humanities, social sciences, natural sciences, and engineering and allows students to design specialized majors and engage in pre-professional programs. It is noted for its programs in the fields of psychology, geography, physics, biology, and entrepreneurship and is a member of the Higher Education Consortium of Central Massachusetts which enables students to cross-register to attend courses at other area institutions including Worcester Polytechnic Institute and the College of the Holy Cross. As a liberal arts–based research university, Clark makes substantial research opportunities available to its students, notably at the undergraduate level through LEEP project funding, yet is also respected for its intimate environment as the second smallest university counted among the top 66 national universities by U.S. News & World Report and as one of 40 Colleges That Change Lives. It is classified among "R2: Doctoral Universities – High research activity". It was a founding member of the Association of American Universities, but departed in 1999.

Graduate and professional programs are offered through the Graduate School, the Graduate School of Management, the Graduate School of Geography, the Frances L. Hiatt School of Psychology, the Gustaf H. Carlson School of Chemistry, the Adam Institute for Urban Teaching and School Practice, the International Development, Community and Environment (IDCE), the School of Professional Studies, and the Strassler Center for Holocaust and Genocide Studies.

The university competes intercollegiately in 17 NCAA Division III varsity sports as the Clark Cougars and is a part of the New England Women's and Men's Athletic Conference. Intramural and club sports are also offered in a wide range of activities.

Clark faculty and alumni have founded numerous companies and organizations, including Panera Bread, the American Psychological Association, and the American Physical Society, and have played leading roles in the development of modern rocketry, the wind chill factor, and the birth control pill. The university is also the alma mater of at least three living billionaires, in addition to its alumni having won three Pulitzer Prizes, multiple Suey Awards, and an Emmy Award.

History

Founding, Cornell University model, and early history
On January 17, 1887, successful American businessman Jonas Gilman Clark announced his intention to found and endow a university in the city of Worcester, filing a petition in the Massachusetts Legislature requesting a charter for Clark University. An Act of Incorporation was duly enacted by the legislature and signed by the governor on March 31 of that same year. Clark University was to incorporate the best features of universities in continental Europe and America, particularly Cornell University and Johns Hopkins.

Clark, who was a friend of Leland Stanford, was probably inspired by the plans for Stanford University (also inspired by Cornell University) and founded the university with an endowment of one million dollars, and later added another million dollars because he feared the university might someday face a lack of funds. Opening on October 2, 1889, Clark was the first all-graduate university in the United States, with departments in mathematics, physics, chemistry, biology, and psychology.

G. Stanley Hall was appointed the first president of Clark University in 1888. He had been a professor of psychology and pedagogy at Johns Hopkins University, which had been founded just a few years prior and was quickly becoming a model of the modern research university. Hall spent seven months in Europe visiting other universities and recruiting faculty. He became the founder of the American Psychological Association and earned the first PhD in psychology in the United States at Harvard. Clark has played a prominent role in the development of psychology as a distinguished discipline in the United States ever since. Franz Boas, founder of American cultural anthropology and adviser for the first PhD in anthropology which was granted at Clark in 1891, taught at Clark from 1888 until 1892 when he resigned in a dispute with President Hall over academic freedom and joined the faculty of Columbia University. Albert A. Michelson, the first American to receive a Nobel Prize in Physics, best known for his involvement in the Michelson–Morley experiment, which measured the speed of light, was a professor from 1889 to 1892 before becoming head of the physics department at the University of Chicago.

Jonas G. Clark died in 1900, leaving gifts to the university and campus library, but reserving half of his estate for the foundation of an undergraduate college. This had been strongly opposed by President Hall in years past, but Clark College opened in 1902, managed independently of Clark University. Clark College and Clark University had different presidents until Hall's retirement in 1920. Clark University began admitting women after Clark's death, and the first female PhD in psychology was awarded in 1908. Early PhD students in psychology were ethnically diverse, with several early graduates being Japanese. In 1920, Francis Sumner became the first African American to earn a PhD in psychology.

Clark University, along with Stanford and Johns Hopkins, was one of the fourteen founding members of the Association of American Universities, an organization of universities with the most prestigious profiles in research and graduate education, and was one of only three New England universities, along with Harvard and Yale, to be a founding member. Clark withdrew its membership in 1999, citing a conflict with its mission.

Clark Lectures

In order to celebrate the 20th anniversary of Clark's opening, President Hall invited a number of leading thinkers to the university. Among them was Sigmund Freud who, accompanied by Carl Jung, delivered his five famous "Clark Lectures" there over the course of five days in September 1909, introducing psychoanalysis to an American audience. This was Freud's only visit to the United States. Clark granted Freud an honorary degree, which hangs in the Sigmund Freud House in Vienna, Austria. It was one of the few official distinctions Freud received during his lifetime.

Later history
In the 1920s Robert Goddard, a pioneer of rocketry, considered one of the founders of space and missile technology, was chairman of the Physics Department. The Robert H. Goddard Library is named for him.

The Graduate School of Management (GSOM) was founded in 1982. In 1997, Clark announced the first PhD program in Holocaust Studies in the United States. This after the university convinced Debórah Dwork to leave Yale University and become Clark's first professor of Holocaust studies in the prior year.

2000s
The Mosakowski Institute for Public Enterprise was established in fall 2007 due to a founding gift from two Clark alumni, William '76 and Jane '75 Mosakowski.

U.S. Secretary of State and former senator and democratic presidential candidate Hillary Clinton spoke at Clark University on February 4, 2008, to an audience of approximately 3,500 in the Kneller Athletic Center.

In March 2009, Clark University convened a first-of-its-kind National Conference on Liberal Education and Effective Practice, co-sponsored by Clark's Mosakowski Institute for Public Enterprise and the Association of American Colleges and Universities.

In April 2009, then-President John Bassett denied Clark University Students for Palestinian Rights, a student group, permission to bring Norman Finkelstein to speak about the "Gaza Massacre" (2008–2009 Gaza War) because Finkelstein "would invite controversy and not dialogue or understanding". He also cited a conflict in scheduling regarding a conference on Holocaust and Genocide Studies presented by the university in the same month. However, following protests, which included a public protest in the center of campus, a petition campaign and outreach by alumni, students and faculty, Basset reversed his decision and allowed Finkelstein to speak on April 27, the last day of classes for the semester. Finkelstein spoke to around 400 students, faculty and community members in Atwood Hall.

In April 2010, Clark University received the largest gift in its 123-year history, a $14.2 million offering from the late head of Hanover Insurance, one of the nation's biggest property and casualty insurers. The gift from John Adam is intended to strengthen Clark's graduate programs in education, promote college-readiness among minority students and bolster its research profile related to urban education. This donation created the Adams Education Fund, which will enhance Clark's nationally recognized model for urban secondary education and reform, teacher-training, and community education partnerships.

On July 1, 2010, former provost David Angel became the ninth president of Clark, succeeding John Bassett, who went on to become president of Heritage University, located on the Yakama Indian Reservation in Toppenish, Washington.

Clark University has an ongoing renovation project that will cover several buildings. In the summer of 2010, overhauls occurred in Bullock and Wright Hall dormitories.

In summer 2012, Clark University underwent more renovations. The city of Worcester allowed the university to close Downing Street to unite the campus. The area was landscaped to become a pedestrian plaza. Johnson and Sanford halls were united to become the Johnson Sanford Center featuring new social, study, and multimedia spaces. The project included addition of an outdoor roof terrace and an elevator to all levels. The university has recently begun a project called LEEP to connect students and the world of academia to practical experience.

Summer 2016 saw the completion of a new Alumni and Student Engagement Center building, extending the campus across Main Street. The facility is a mixed-use building containing administrative offices, lecture halls, meeting rooms, and some retail space, and features a modern architectural look and a roof-top solar array.

In 2022, graduate students at the university organized as Clark University Graduate Workers United, a chapter of Teamsters Local 170. An NLRB-overseen election resulted in a 100–7 vote in favor of unionization, after which the union and university entered into negotiations. On October 3, 2022, the graduate workers' union began an indefinite strike over wages, benefits, and working conditions that continued until that Friday, October 7, when the union and the university announced a tentative agreement on a contract. On the following Wednesday, October 13, the union unanimously ratified the contract, which took effect immediately.

Campus

The campus is compact, with most of the major buildings located within the space of a single city block.

The center of campus is known as the Green. The Green is a hub for student activity, and is where most Clarkies spend their time during the warm months. It is the location of Spree Day, the welcome back BBQ, several clubs' events and graduation. The buildings surrounding The Green include Atwood Hall, Jefferson Academic Center, Higgins University Center, Jonas Clark Hall, and the Goddard Library.

Administrative offices are housed in small buildings along Woodland Street, as is the president's house. The new Shaich Family Alumni and Student Engagement Center, named in honor of a $5 million gift from the family of alumnus Ron Shaich, is across Main Street and houses meeting spaces and offices.

Academic facilities
Jonas Clark Hall, built in 1887, was Clark University's first building. It occupies the center of campus and houses the economics, psychology and education departments. Located in the basement of Jonas Clark Hall is the university's cogeneration plant which allows the university to recycle waste heat from electrical generation into hot water, heat, and steam. It was updated in 2013 to a more efficient 2.0 kWh natural gas engine.

Estabrook Hall, located on Woodland Street, is the second oldest building on Clark's campus. Originally constructed as a dormitory, it now functions as the language center and the music center. The upper floors are primarily home to classrooms and offices for the Language, Literature, and Culture department, which includes Spanish, French, German, Latin, and Hebrew. The bottom floor and basement are practice rooms and music halls.

The Jefferson Academic Center houses various social science departments including Women's Studies, Geography, History, Geographical Information Sciences, Political Science, and Sociology.

Atwood Hall, attached to the Jefferson Academic Center, is the primary theater on campus and seats 658. Atwood Hall originally served as the chapel for the university, and in recent decades has been the scene for several notable concerts and speeches. The Grateful Dead (1967 and 1969), the Jimi Hendrix Experience (1968), Janis Joplin (1969), and Bruce Springsteen and the E Street Band (1974) have all played here. A March 15, 1968, concert by the Jimi Hendrix Experience was professionally recorded and released in 1999 as Live at Clark University. In 1963, student D'Army Bailey invited Malcolm X to speak here. Noam Chomsky spoke here on the topic of the Israeli–Palestinian conflict and the Arab Spring April 12, 2011. It was the first-ever lecture given on a Spree Day at Clark. On October 16, 2014, President Bill Clinton spoke in Atwood as a supporter of Martha Coakley's run for Governor of Massachusetts.

The Lasry Center for Bioscience (named for hedge fund manager Marc Lasry and his wife Cathy, both alumni) houses the biology department. It received a LEED Gold certification for its energy efficiency.

The Little Center is the alternate performing arts venue, with its largest room, the Michelson Theater seating 120.

The Academic Commons, also known as the AC, acts as a study area and lounge for the students, and incorporates a Sodexo coffeehouse named Jazzmans, a quiet study area, a computer room, and the Mosakowski Institute for Public Enterprises. The Goddard Library is upstairs from the Academic Commons and houses more than 375,000 volumes.

Libraries

Clark University has 7 libraries. 
 The Goddard Library, the main library of the university
 The Carlson Science Library, a branch of the Goddard library focusing on physics, chemistry and biology
 The Rose Library, which contains volumes concerning genocides 
 The Guy Burnham Map and Aerial Photography Library, founded in 1921 and with an archive with more than 200,000 maps and aerial photographs
 The Jeanne X. Kasperson Research Library which focuses on the global environmental change
 The Language Arts Resource Center provides resources to learn languages
 The Traina Center for the Arts is an audiovisual library

Athletic facilities
The Kneller Athletic Center houses the basketball courts, swimming pool, racquet ball courts, handball courts, and the James and Ada B. Bickman Fitness Center which was opened in 1995 and completely renovated in 2013. Major campus events, such as International Gala, the fall concert, and first year orientation are usually held in the Kneller as the basketball courts are the largest rooms on campus and can accommodate the entire student body. The Thomas M. '62 and Joan E. '60 Dolan Field House opened in May 2003 at which time the Russ Granger Athletic Fields and Corash Tennis Courts around it were reconfigured and renovated. The Boys and Girls Club Track and Field opened in October 2016.

Housing

Students entering Clark must live on campus for the first two years unless their primary address is within  of campus. The residence halls at Clark are organized by those who live there. The halls include the following breakdowns:
 First Year Experience halls (Dana, Bullock and Wright)
 Mixed Class halls (Johnson-Sanford Center and Hughes )
 Single Sex hall (Dodd—female and non-binary only)
 Suite-style and Apartment-style halls (Maywood and Blackstone)

Clark owns apartments that, while outside of the main campus area, exclusively house Clark students.

The first Clark "residence halls" (Wright and Bullock) opened in 1959. Before that time, Estabrook Hall was the men's dormitory and small women's dorms stood in the current location of Little Center and Bullock Hall. Blackstone, the newest of the halls, opened in 2007.

As of fall 2007, gender blind/neutral housing is an option at Clark, meaning that students of different genders can room together.

Clark University released its Climate Action Plan December 15, 2009, detailing strategies for the university to reduce its carbon footprint while strengthening many of its existing sustainability practices. The plan sets two goals with respect to climate neutrality: First is an interim goal of reducing emissions to 20 percent below 2005-levels by 2015. The second goal is to achieve climate neutrality (net zero greenhouse gas emissions) by the year 2030.

Organization

Clark College
Clark College opened in 1902 as the fulfillment of founder Jonas Clark's desire for an undergraduate liberal arts college. The administration of Clark College and Clark University was formally united in 1920 and undergraduate programs continue today under the university.

Graduate School of Management
The Graduate School of Management (GSOM), founded in 1982, is led by Dean Alan Eisner. The school offers a range of master's degrees as well as undergraduate courses in Management, Marketing, and Innovation and Entrepreneurship. Notable alumni of GSOM include Libérat Mfumukeko, secretary-general of the East African Community, Matt Goldman, co-founder of the Blue Man Group

Graduate School of Geography
The Graduate School of Geography (GSG), founded in 1921 by Wallace Walter Atwood and led by Director James McCarthy,  offers bachelor's, master's, and doctoral degrees. Under GSG is Clark Labs, founded in 1987, which developed the IDRISI GIS and image processing software and then the TerrSet geospatial monitoring and modeling software. Alumni of the school include Paul Siple, an Antarctic explorer and inventor of the wind chill factor who attended the school on the recommendation of Admiral Richard E. Byrd. Siple named the Clark Mountains in Antarctica after Clark and several of the peaks after Clark professors in the GSG.

School of Professional Studies
The School of Professional Studies (SPS) offers bachelor's degrees as well as a Master in Public Administration (MPA), Master of Science in Public Communication (MSPC), Master of Science in Information Technology (MSIT), Certificate in Community Human Services, and Certificate of Advanced Graduate Study (CAGS). Called the Evening College from its establishment in 1953 and then the College of Professional and Continuing Education (COPACE) from 1975 to 2016, the school is led by the vice provost for professional education and dean, John LaBrie. It has branch campuses in Łódź and Warsaw, Poland, with the University of Social Sciences and in Astrakhan, Russia with Astrakhan State University. There are also joint programs with Shandong University of Science and Technology and Hefei University of Technology. Alumni of SPS include Olta Xhaçka, Albanian Minister of Defense, and Keith R. Hall, former director of the National Reconnaissance Office.

Frances L. Hiatt School of Psychology
The Hiatt School of Psychology, led by Chair James Córdova, offers undergraduate and doctoral degrees. Notable alumni include Francis Sumner, the father of black psychology, and Arnold Gesell, noted child psychologist. The American Psychological Association was founded at Clark in 1892 by Clark's first president, psychologist G. Stanley Hall. It was also at Clark that mazes were first used to study rat behavior by psychology Professor Edmund Sanford in his laboratory.

Gustaf H. Carlson School of Chemistry and Biochemistry
The Carlson School of Chemistry offers undergraduate, master's, and doctoral degrees, including a 3/2 engineering program with Columbia University's Fu Foundation School of Engineering and Applied Science. The school is led by Chair Shuanghong Huo. What was then known as Clark's chemical laboratories was once directed by Professor Charles A. Kraus, a noted chemist who was a consultant to the U.S. Chemical Warfare Service during World War I and the Manhattan Project during World War II. He also developed the anti-knock additive in gasoline.

International Development, Community and Environment Department
The International Development, Community and Environment (IDCE) Department was founded in 2000. Led by Director Edward R. Carr, it is home to nearly 300 graduate and undergraduate students each year. IDCE offers an undergraduate major in International Development and Social Change and master's degrees in International Development, Environmental Science and Policy, Community Development and Planning, and Global and Community Health. It also jointly manages the Masters in Geographic Information Science with the Graduate School of Geography, and offers a dual degree program (MBA/ES&P) with the Graduate School of Management.  The QS World University Rankings ranked IDCE's International Development program 15th for academic reputation in 2018.

Becker School of Design & Technology 
Becker School of Design & Technology was founded in March 2021 after Becker College announced its closure at the end of the Spring 2021 semester. Becker School of Design & Technology offers a bachelor's degree in interactive media with multiple concentrations as well as a Design Your Own undergraduate major. A graduate MFA in interactive media is also offered. Clark University was ranked #7 by The Princeton Review in the Top 25 Game Design 2021.

Academics

Clark offers 32 undergraduate majors. It offers 57 study abroad and away programs in 34 countries. Its most popular undergraduate majors, based on 2021 graduates, were:
Psychology (85)
Economics (48)
Political Science and Government (47)
Business Administration and Management (43)
Biology/Biological Sciences (37)

Clark has 212 full-time faculty, representing a 10:1 student-faculty ratio. Ninety-four percent of Clark's faculty have doctoral or terminal degrees. Clark University is accredited by the New England Commission of Higher Education.

In recent years, Clark has been noted especially for its geography and psychology departments, with the latter having a distinctive humanistic orientation. The School of Geography was founded by then President Wallace Walter Atwood in 1921, and is the first institution in the United States established for graduate study in this science. It has granted more doctoral degrees than any other geography program in the country. The geography department is best known for its strength in human-environment geography and for the development of the IDRISI geographic information systems software, named for the famous 12th century explorer and cartographer Muhammad al-Idrisi by Prof. Ron Eastman. It was ranked #1 for undergraduate geography by Rugg's Recommendations on Colleges and has consistently been ranked in the top 10 in the nation by other publications. The geography department also offers a graduate-level degree in GIS as part of the Fifth-Year Free program. The department's mission is ambitious: "to educate undergraduate and graduate students to be imaginative and contributing citizens of the world, and to advance the frontiers of knowledge and understanding through rigorous scholarship and creative effort."

In recent years, Clark has received widespread media coverage for its "Fifth-Year Free" program. Under Clark's BA/MA program with the fifth year free, undergraduates who maintain a B+ average are eligible for tuition-free enrollment in its one-year graduate programs, meaning that they can get a Master of Arts degree for the price of a bachelor's degree. Students apply to master's degree programs in their junior year, begin meeting requirements in their senior year and typically complete those requirements in the fifth year. Bachelor's degrees are granted en route to the master's degree.

For Fall 2019, Clark received 7,639 freshmen applications; 4,032 were admitted (52.8%) and 665 enrolled. The average high school grade point average (GPA) of the enrolled freshmen was 3.65, while the middle 50% range of SAT scores was 600–690 for evidence-based reading and writing, and 580–680 for math. The middle 50% range of the ACT Composite score was 27–31.

Rankings and recognition
Admission to Clark is rated "more selective" by U.S. News & World Report.

Clark University was featured on Princeton Review's 2021 list of best value colleges in the United States and in 2020 it was ranked No.3 of the Top 20 Best Schools for Making an Impact in the United States.

Student life

Student body
As of fall 2019, Clark's student body comprised 2,349 undergraduates and 1,149 graduate and professional students. International students make up 11.5% of undergraduates. In addition, 21% of the undergraduate student body is classified as ALANA (Asian-, Latino-, African-, and Native-American) and 61% of undergraduates are female.

Residential life
The majority of the undergraduate student body, 66%, lives on campus. Clark requires undergraduates to do so for their first two years, with first-years being assigned housing based on their responses to a Housing Preferences Form. Once first-years have been assigned housing, a seniority system, whereby seniors have the first choice of spaces left, juniors have the second, and sophomores the third, ensures that seniors and juniors are usually able to live on campus if they wish to. Nonetheless, some choose to live in off-campus apartments in the immediate neighborhood of Clark, along with the graduate students outside the 1% that live on campus.

Student organizations
There are more than 130 student clubs and organizations at Clark. All these are headed by the Clark Undergraduate Student Council which disseminates more than $750,000 in budgets to the various clubs and their events.

Media and publications
The Scarlet is Clark University's student newspaper. It is published weekly and has four sections: News, Opinions, Living Arts, and Sports. Clark's literary magazine, Caesura, is published annually and features artwork, poetry, prose, essays, and creative non-fiction submitted by undergraduate and graduate students. STIR Magazine, Clark's life, culture, and style magazine was founded by Diana Levine as a student project in 2004. STIR began with a three-person staff and in black and white, and now has about 30 core students who contribute to its production in full color. The Scholarly Undergraduate Research Journal (SURJ) is Clark's student-run undergraduate research journal. It publishes undergraduate academic work and is intended to provide undergraduates with "experiences in the peer review and academic publication processes." Peer reviewers consist of undergraduate and graduate students, as well as faculty. The Freudian Slip, is a satire/humor publication founded in 2015. It publishes semi-weekly satirical articles about local and worldwide events. It is also the first university publication published exclusively online.

There is also a student-run internet radio station, Radio of Clark University (ROCU), with over 100 student DJs.

Events
Spree Day originated in 1903 to coincide with St. Patrick's Day. It is traditional to not tell first-year students about Spree Day. Instead, the Senior class awakens the first-years by running through the dorms banging pots and pans.

While Spree Day is a day of recreation, Clark University also holds the Academic Spree Day annually during Spring semester. This academic event is when Clark undergraduates present their research and creative work.

Athletics
Clark University fields 17 NCAA Division III varsity teams which compete intercollegiately as the Clark Cougars in the New England Women's and Men's Athletic Conference. Men's sports include baseball, basketball, cross country, lacrosse, soccer, swimming and diving, and tennis; women's sports include basketball, cross country, field hockey, crew, lacrosse, soccer, softball, swimming and diving, tennis, and volleyball.

The university also offers a variety of club and intramural sports such as soccer, ice hockey, ultimate frisbee, quidditch, volleyball and basketball. This contributes to Clark's 65 percent student participation rate in athletics.

Clark and the community
In 1985, the university engaged in a partnership with community groups and business organizations to revitalize Clark neighborhoods. Its efforts in the University Park Partnership program include refurbishing dilapidated or abandoned homes, reselling them to area residents, and subsidizing mortgages for new home buyers.

In 1997, Clark opened a secondary public school, the University Park Campus School (UPCS), that is also a professional development school for Clark's teacher education program. Because of its long hours and demanding curricula, UPCS has been lauded as a model for collaboration between a university and an urban district. Students are able to attend Clark University free of charge upon graduation, provided they meet certain residency and admissions requirements. In the May 16, 2005, issue of Newsweek, UPCS was named the 68th best high school in the nation. UPCS was featured in a page-one story entitled "Town-grown triumph: In poorest part of Worcester, Clark helps put children on path to college" of the November 22, 2007, edition of The Boston Globe.

The UPCS collaborative is one of several sponsored by Clark's Jacob Hiatt Center for Urban Education focused on urban teacher education and school reform.

Research
Clark has seven research institutes and centers.

The William and Jane Mosakowski Institute for Public Enterprise seeks to improve through the successful mobilization of use-inspired research the effectiveness of government and other institutions in addressing social concerns. The institute focuses on important social issues, including focal areas such as education reform, environmental sustainability, access to healthcare, human development, well-being and global change.

The George Perkins Marsh Institute conducts collaborative, interdisciplinary research on human-environment relationships and the human dimensions of global environmental change.

The Strassler Family Center for Holocaust and Genocide Studies an interdisciplinary center, founded in 1998, which focuses on the causes and effects of Holocausts and Genocides around the world. It is housed in Lasry House, donated by investor Marc Lasry and his wife Cathy in honor of their fathers Irwin Cohen and Moise Lasry. Debórah Dwork is the founding director and also Rose Professor of Holocaust History at Clark.

The Jacob Hiatt Center for Urban Education develops models of urban schooling, teaching and teacher education through local partnership, in order to learn from these models and expand the knowledge-base of effective practice through research.

The Center for Risk and Security (CRS) at the George Perkins Marsh Institute conducts in-depth studies of homeland security issues using a risk-analysis perspective. The center's broad range of security issues includes: terrorism; disaster management; law and human rights; resource availability; and public health.

The Center for Technology, Environment and Development (CENTED), founded in 1987, is a center for the study of natural and technological hazards in the United States. Projects include theoretical work on hazard analysis, hazard taxonomies, vulnerability, environmental equity, corporate risk management, emergency planning and hazardous waste transportation.

Clark Labs is engaged in the research and development on geospatial technologies including the development of computer software and analytical techniques for GIS and remote sensing with an emphasis on monitoring and modeling earth system dynamics. Clark Labs continues to develop and distribute TerrSet (formerly IDRISI), a geographic information system (GIS) software package that is in use at more than 40,000 sites in over 180 countries worldwide. Its chief is Dr. J. Ronald Eastman, creator of IDRISI.

Notable people

The university's most famous alumnus was graduate student and professor Robert H. Goddard, a pioneering rocket scientist who conducted many experiments on campus. Clark's first president, G. Stanley Hall, founded the American Psychological Association in July 1892 at Clark. Grayson L. Kirk, a president of the Council on Foreign Relations during the Cold War and the president of Columbia University during the student protests of 1968 received his master's degree from the university, as did D'Army Bailey a prominent civil rights activist and the founder of the National Civil Rights Museum in Memphis, Tennessee. Clark is also notable for being the site of Sigmund Freud's only lectures in the United States and for being the university where Chinese poet Xu Zhimo earned his BA.

In popular culture
Gus Van Sant's The Sea of Trees was filmed in part on Clark University's campus. Leading actor Matthew McConaughey's character, Arthur Brennan, is a physics professor and scenes were filmed in and around Clark's Sackler Sciences Center. Clark was also a shooting location for the thriller Black Car, an independent film about a law student out for revenge, with Clark as the law school. The novel Something for Nothing, a semi-comic take on the struggles of a professor new to academia written by economist Michael W. Klein, is set at the fictional "Kester College," which like Clark University has a large main building that legend says was designed so that it could be converted into a factory should the college fail. Klein began his teaching career at Clark. Burning Annie, an independent comedy, was written and produced by two Clark alumni and is a semi-autobiographical film based on the experiences of one at Clark. One of the main characters in Annie Baker's Pulitzer Prize-winning play The Flick, an African American movie usher named Avery, is a Clarkie with a full-ride to attend the university.

References

Further reading
 Ryan, W. Carson. Studies in Early Graduate Education: The Johns Hopkins, Clark University, The University of Chicago. New York: The Carnegie Foundation for the Advancement of Teaching, 1939. .
 Koelsch, William A. Clark University, 1887–1987: A Narrative History. Worcester: Clark University Press, 1987. . .

External links

 
 Clark Athletics website
 

 
1887 establishments in Massachusetts
Educational institutions established in 1887
Liberal arts colleges in Massachusetts
National Register of Historic Places in Worcester, Massachusetts
Private universities and colleges in Massachusetts
Universities and colleges in Worcester, Massachusetts